London is the capital and largest city of England and the United Kingdom, with a population of just under 9 million. It stands on the River Thames in south-east England at the head of a  estuary down to the North Sea, and has been a major settlement for two millennia. The City of London, its ancient core and financial centre, was founded by the Romans as Londinium and retains its medieval boundaries. The City of Westminster, to the west of the City of London, has for centuries hosted the national government and parliament.  Since the 19th century, the name "London" has also referred to the metropolis around this core, historically split between the counties of Middlesex, Essex, Surrey, Kent, and Hertfordshire, which since 1965 has largely comprised Greater London, which is governed by 33 local authorities and the Greater London Authority. 

As one of the world's major global cities, London exerts a strong influence on its arts, entertainment, fashion, commerce and finance, education, health care, media, science and technology, tourism, and transport and communications. Its GDP (€801.66 billion in 2017) makes it the largest urban economy in Europe, and it is one of the major financial centres in the world. With Europe's largest concentration of higher education institutions, it is home to some of the highest-ranked academic institutions in the world—Imperial College London in natural and applied sciences, the London School of Economics in social sciences, and the comprehensive University College London. London is the most visited city in Europe and has the busiest city airport system in the world. The London Underground is the oldest rapid transit system in the world. 

London's diverse cultures encompass over 300 languages. The mid-2018 population of Greater London of about 9 million made it Europe's third-most populous city, accounting for 13.4% of the population of the United Kingdom and over 16% of the population of England. The Greater London Built-up Area is the fourth-most populous in Europe with about 9.8 million inhabitants at the 2011 census. The London metropolitan area is the third-most populous in Europe with about 14 million inhabitants in 2016, granting London the status of a megacity.

London has four World Heritage Sites: the Tower of London; Kew Gardens; the combined Palace of Westminster, Westminster Abbey, and St Margaret's Church; and also the historic settlement in Greenwich, where the Royal Observatory, Greenwich defines the prime meridian (0° longitude) and Greenwich Mean Time. Other landmarks include Buckingham Palace, the London Eye, Piccadilly Circus, St Paul's Cathedral, Tower Bridge, and Trafalgar Square. London has many museums, galleries, libraries and cultural venues, including the British Museum, National Gallery, Natural History Museum, Tate Modern, British Library, and numerous West End theatres. Important sporting events held in London include the FA Cup Final (held annually at Wembley Stadium), Wimbledon Tennis Championships and the London Marathon. In 2012, London became the first city to host three Summer Olympic Games.

Toponymy

London is an ancient name, already attested in the first century AD, usually in the Latinised form ; for example, handwritten Roman tablets recovered in the city originating from AD 65/70–80 include the word  ('in London').

Over the years, the name has attracted many mythically based explanations. The earliest attested appears in Geoffrey of Monmouth's , written around 1136.

Modern scientific analyses of the name must account for the origins of the different forms found in early sources: Latin (usually ), Old English (usually ), and Welsh (usually ), with reference to the known developments over time of sounds in those different languages.

The toponymy of the Common Brythonic form is debated. Prominent was Richard Coates' 1998 argument that it derived from pre-Celtic Old European *, meaning "river too wide to ford". Coates suggested this was a name given to the part of the River Thames that flows through London, from which the settlement gained the Celtic form of its name, . However, most work has accepted a plain Celtic origin. Peter Schrijver has specifically suggested that the name originally meant "place that floods (periodically, tidally)".

Until 1889, the name "London" applied officially only to the City of London, but since then it has also referred to the County of London and to Greater London.

In writing, "London" is occasionally contracted to "LDN". Such usage originated in SMS language and often appears in a social media user profile, suffixing an alias or handle.

History

Prehistory
In 1993, remains of a Bronze Age bridge were found on the south foreshore upstream from Vauxhall Bridge. This either crossed the Thames or reached a now-lost island in it. Two of the timbers were radiocarbon dated to 1750–1285 BCE.

In 2010, foundations of a large timber structure, dated to 4800–4500 BCE, were found on the Thames's south foreshore downstream from Vauxhall Bridge. The function of the mesolithic structure is unclear. Both structures are on the south bank of the Thames, where the now-underground River Effra flows into the Thames.

Roman London

Despite the evidence of scattered Brythonic settlements in the area, the first major settlement was founded by the Romans about four years after the invasion of 43 AD. This only lasted until about 61 AD, when the Iceni tribe led by Queen Boudica stormed it and burnt it to the ground. The next planned incarnation of Londinium prospered, superseding Colchester as capital of the Roman province of Britannia in 100. At its height in the 2nd century, Roman London had a population of about 60,000.

Anglo-Saxon and Viking-period London
With the early 5th-century collapse of Roman rule, London ceased to be a capital and the walled city of Londinium was effectively abandoned, although Roman civilisation continued around St Martin-in-the-Fields until about 450. From about 500, an Anglo-Saxon settlement known as Lundenwic developed slightly west of the old Roman city. By about 680 the city had become a major port again, but there is little evidence of large-scale production. From the 820s repeated Viking assaults brought decline. Three are recorded; those in 851 and 886 succeeded, while the last, in 994, was rebuffed.

The Vikings applied Danelaw over much of eastern and northern England, its boundary running roughly from London to Chester as an area of political and geographical control imposed by the Viking incursions formally agreed by the Danish warlord, Guthrum and the West Saxon king Alfred the Great in 886. The Anglo-Saxon Chronicle records that Alfred "refounded" London in 886. Archaeological research shows this involved abandonment of Lundenwic and a revival of life and trade within the old Roman walls. London then grew slowly until a dramatic increase in about 950.

By the 11th century, London was clearly the largest town in England. Westminster Abbey, rebuilt in Romanesque style by King Edward the Confessor, was one of the grandest churches in Europe. Winchester had been the capital of Anglo-Saxon England, but from this time London became the main forum for foreign traders and the base for defence in time of war. In the view of Frank Stenton: "It had the resources, and it was rapidly developing the dignity and the political self-consciousness appropriate to a national capital."

Middle Ages

After winning the Battle of Hastings, William, Duke of Normandy was crowned King of England in newly completed Westminster Abbey on Christmas Day 1066. William built the Tower of London, the first of many such in England rebuilt in stone in the south-eastern corner of the city, to intimidate the inhabitants. In 1097, William II began building Westminster Hall, close by the abbey of the same name. It became the basis of a new Palace of Westminster.

In the 12th century, the institutions of central government, which had hitherto followed the royal English court around the country, grew in size and sophistication and became increasingly fixed, for most purposes at Westminster, although the royal treasury, having been moved from Winchester, came to rest in the Tower. While the City of Westminster developed into a true governmental capital, its distinct neighbour, the City of London, remained England's largest city and principal commercial centre and flourished under its own unique administration, the Corporation of London. In 1100, its population was some 18,000; by 1300 it had grown to nearly 100,000. Disaster struck in the form of the Black Death in the mid-14th century, when London lost nearly a third of its population. London was the focus of the Peasants' Revolt in 1381.

London was also a centre of England's Jewish population before their expulsion by Edward I in 1290. Violence against Jews occurred in 1190, when it was rumoured that the new king had ordered their massacre after they had presented themselves at his coronation. In 1264 during the Second Barons' War, Simon de Montfort's rebels killed 500 Jews while attempting to seize records of debts.

Early modern

During the Tudor period the Reformation produced a gradual shift to Protestantism. Much of London property passed from church to private ownership, which accelerated trade and business in the city. In 1475, the Hanseatic League set up a main trading base (kontor) of England in London, called the Stalhof or Steelyard. It remained until 1853, when the Hanseatic cities of Lübeck, Bremen and Hamburg sold the property to South Eastern Railway. Woollen cloth was shipped undyed and undressed from 14th/15th century London to the nearby shores of the Low Countries, where it was considered indispensable.

Yet English maritime enterprise hardly reached beyond the seas of north-west Europe. The commercial route to Italy and the Mediterranean was normally through Antwerp and over the Alps; any ships passing through the Strait of Gibraltar to or from England were likely to be Italian or Ragusan. The reopening of the Netherlands to English shipping in January 1565 spurred a burst of commercial activity. The Royal Exchange was founded. Mercantilism grew and monopoly traders such as the East India Company were founded as trade expanded to the New World. London became the main North Sea port, with migrants arriving from England and abroad. The population rose from about 50,000 in 1530 to about 225,000 in 1605.

In the 16th century, William Shakespeare and his contemporaries lived in London during English Renaissance theatre. Shakespeare's Globe Theatre was constructed in 1599 in Southwark. Stage performances came to a halt in London when Puritan authorities shut down the theatres in the 1640s and 1650s. The ban on theatre was lifted during the Restoration in 1660, and London's oldest operating theatre, Drury Lane, opened in 1663 in what is now the West End theatre district.

By the end of the Tudor period in 1603, London was still compact. There was an assassination attempt on James I in Westminster, in the Gunpowder Plot of 5 November 1605.

In 1637, the government of Charles I attempted to reform administration in the London area. This called for the Corporation of the city to extend its jurisdiction and administration over expanding areas around the city. Fearing an attempt by the Crown to diminish the Liberties of London, coupled with a lack of interest in administering these additional areas or concern by city guilds of having to share power, caused the Corporation's "The Great Refusal", a decision which largely continues to account for the unique governmental status of the City.

In the English Civil War the majority of Londoners supported the Parliamentary cause. After an initial advance by the Royalists in 1642, culminating in the battles of Brentford and Turnham Green, London was surrounded by a defensive perimeter wall known as the Lines of Communication. The lines were built by up to 20,000 people, and were completed in under two months.
The fortifications failed their only test when the New Model Army entered London in 1647, and they were levelled by Parliament the same year.

London was plagued by disease in the early 17th century, culminating in the Great Plague of 1665–1666, which killed up to 100,000 people, or a fifth of the population.

The Great Fire of London broke out in 1666 in Pudding Lane in the city and quickly swept through the wooden buildings. Rebuilding took over ten years and was supervised by polymath Robert Hooke as surveyor for the City of London. In 1708 Christopher Wren's masterpiece, St Paul's Cathedral, was completed. During the Georgian era, new districts such as Mayfair were formed in the west; new bridges over the Thames encouraged development in South London. In the east, the Port of London expanded downstream. London's development as an international financial centre matured for much of the 18th century.

In 1762, George III acquired Buckingham House, which was enlarged over the next 75 years. During the 18th century, London was said to be dogged by crime, and the Bow Street Runners were established in 1750 as a professional police force. A total of more than 200 offences were punishable by death, including petty theft. Epidemics during the 1720s and 30s saw most children born in the city die before reaching their fifth birthday.

Coffee-houses became a popular place to debate ideas, as growing literacy and development of the printing press made news widely available, with Fleet Street becoming the centre of the British press. The invasion of Amsterdam by Napoleonic armies led many financiers to relocate to London and the first London international issue was arranged in 1817. Around the same time, the Royal Navy became the world's leading war fleet, acting as a major deterrent to potential economic adversaries. The repeal of the Corn Laws in 1846 was specifically aimed at weakening Dutch economic power. London then overtook Amsterdam as the leading international financial centre.
According to Samuel Johnson:

Late modern and contemporary
With the onset of the Industrial Revolution in Britain, an unprecedented growth in urbanisation took place, and the number of High Streets (the primary street for retail in Britain) rapidly grew. London was the world's largest city from about 1831 to 1925, with a population density of 325 per hectare. In addition to the growing number of stores selling goods such as Harding, Howell & Co. on Pall Mall—a contender for the first department store—the streets had scores of street sellers loudly advertising their goods and services. London's overcrowded conditions led to cholera epidemics, claiming 14,000 lives in 1848, and 6,000 in 1866. Rising traffic congestion led to the creation of the world's first local urban rail network. The Metropolitan Board of Works oversaw infrastructure expansion in the capital and some surrounding counties; it was abolished in 1889 when the London County Council was created out of county areas surrounding the capital.

From the early years of the 20th century onwards, teashops were found on High Streets across London and the rest of Britain, with Lyons, who opened the first of their chain of teashops in Piccadilly in 1894, leading the way. The tearooms, such as the Criterion in Piccadilly, became a popular meeting place for women from the suffrage movement. The city was the target of many attacks during the suffragette bombing and arson campaign, between 1912 and 1914, which saw historic landmarks such as Westminster Abbey and St Paul's Cathedral bombed.

London was bombed by the Germans in the First World War, and during the Second World War, the Blitz and other bombings by the German Luftwaffe killed over 30,000 Londoners, destroying large tracts of housing and other buildings across the city.

The 1948 Summer Olympics were held at the original Wembley Stadium, while London was still recovering from the war. From the 1940s, London became home to many immigrants, primarily from Commonwealth countries such as Jamaica, India, Bangladesh and Pakistan, making London one of the most diverse cities in the world. In 1951, the Festival of Britain was held on the South Bank. The Great Smog of 1952 led to the Clean Air Act 1956, which ended the "pea soup fogs" for which London had been notorious and had earned it the nickname the "Big Smoke".

Starting mainly in the mid-1960s, London became a centre for worldwide youth culture, exemplified by the Swinging London sub-culture associated with the King's Road, Chelsea and Carnaby Street. The role of trendsetter revived in the punk era. In 1965 London's political boundaries were expanded in response to the growth of the urban area and a new Greater London Council was created. During The Troubles in Northern Ireland, London was hit from 1973 by bomb attacks by the Provisional Irish Republican Army. These attacks lasted for two decades, starting with the Old Bailey bombing. Racial inequality was highlighted by the 1981 Brixton riot.

Greater London's population declined in the decades after the Second World War, from an estimated peak of 8.6 million in 1939 to around 6.8 million in the 1980s. The principal ports for London moved downstream to Felixstowe and Tilbury, with the London Docklands area becoming a focus for regeneration, including the Canary Wharf development. This was born out of London's increasing role as an international financial centre in the 1980s. The Thames Barrier was completed in the 1980s to protect London against tidal surges from the North Sea.

The Greater London Council was abolished in 1986, leaving London with no central administration until 2000 and the creation of the Greater London Authority. To mark the 21st century, the Millennium Dome, London Eye and Millennium Bridge were constructed. On 6 July 2005 London was awarded the 2012 Summer Olympics, as the first city to stage the Olympic Games three times. On 7 July 2005, three London Underground trains and a double-decker bus were bombed in a series of terrorist attacks.

In 2008, Time named London alongside New York City and Hong Kong as Nylonkong, hailing them as the world's three most influential global cities. In January 2015, Greater London's population was estimated to be 8.63 million, its highest since 1939. During the Brexit referendum in 2016, the UK as a whole decided to leave the European Union, but most London constituencies voted for remaining.

Administration

Local government

The administration of London is formed of two tiers: a citywide, strategic tier and a local tier. Citywide administration is coordinated by the Greater London Authority (GLA), while local administration is carried out by 33 smaller authorities. The GLA consists of two elected components: the mayor of London, who has executive powers, and the London Assembly, which scrutinises the mayor's decisions and can accept or reject the mayor's budget proposals each year.

The headquarters of the GLA is City Hall, Newham. The mayor since 2016 has been Sadiq Khan, the first Muslim mayor of a major Western capital. The mayor's statutory planning strategy is published as the London Plan, which was most recently revised in 2011. The local authorities are the councils of the 32 London boroughs and the City of London Corporation. They are responsible for most local services, such as local planning, schools, social services, local roads and refuse collection. Certain functions, such as waste management, are provided through joint arrangements. In 2009–2010 the combined revenue expenditure by London councils and the GLA amounted to just over £22 billion (£14.7 billion for the boroughs and £7.4 billion for the GLA).

The London Fire Brigade is the statutory fire and rescue service for Greater London, run by the London Fire and Emergency Planning Authority. It is the third largest fire service in the world. National Health Service ambulance services are provided by the London Ambulance Service (LAS) NHS Trust, the largest free-at-the-point-of-use emergency ambulance service in the world. The London Air Ambulance charity operates in conjunction with the LAS where required. Her Majesty's Coastguard and the Royal National Lifeboat Institution operate on the River Thames, which is under the jurisdiction of the Port of London Authority from Teddington Lock to the sea.

National government

London is the seat of the Government of the United Kingdom. Many government departments, as well as the prime minister's residence at 10 Downing Street, are based close to the Palace of Westminster, particularly along Whitehall. There are 73 members of Parliament (MPs) from London, elected from local parliamentary constituencies in the national Parliament. , 49 are from the Labour Party, 21 are Conservatives, and three are Liberal Democrats. The ministerial post of minister for London was created in 1994. , the role of minister for London has been vacant since 27 October 2022.

Policing and crime

Policing in Greater London, with the exception of the City of London, is provided by the Metropolitan Police ("The Met"), overseen by the mayor through the Mayor's Office for Policing and Crime (MOPAC). The Met is also referred to as Scotland Yard after the location of its original headquarters in a road called Great Scotland Yard in Whitehall. The City of London has its own police force – the City of London Police. The British Transport Police are responsible for police services on National Rail, London Underground, Docklands Light Railway and Tramlink services.
The Ministry of Defence Police is a special police force in London, which does not generally become involved with policing the general public.

Crime rates vary widely across different areas of London. Crime figures are made available nationally at Local Authority and Ward level. In 2015, there were 118 homicides, a 25.5% increase over 2014. The Metropolitan Police have made detailed crime figures, broken down by category at borough and ward level, available on their website since 2000.

Recorded crime has been rising in London, notably violent crime and murder by stabbing and other means have risen. There were 50 murders from the start of 2018 to mid April 2018. Funding cuts to police in London are likely to have contributed to this, though other factors are also involved.

Geography

Scope

London, also known as Greater London, is one of nine regions of England and the top subdivision covering most of the city's metropolis. The City of London at its core once comprised the whole settlement, but as its urban area grew, the Corporation of London resisted attempts to amalgamate the City with its suburbs, causing "London" to be defined several ways.

Forty per cent of Greater London is covered by the London post town, in which 'LONDON' forms part of postal addresses. The London telephone area code (020) covers a larger area, similar in size to Greater London, although some outer districts are excluded and some just outside included. The Greater London boundary has been aligned to the M25 motorway in places.

Further urban expansion is now prevented by the Metropolitan Green Belt, although the built-up area extends beyond the boundary in places, producing a separately defined Greater London Urban Area. Beyond this is the vast London commuter belt. Greater London is split for some purposes into Inner London and Outer London, and by the River Thames into North and South, with an informal central London area. Based on the centre of gravity of its map, the geographical centre of London is in the London Borough of Lambeth,  to the north-east of Lambeth North tube station.

Status
Within London, both the City of London and the City of Westminster have city status and both the City of London and the remainder of Greater London are counties for the purposes of lieutenancies. The area of Greater London includes areas that are part of the historic counties of Middlesex, Kent, Surrey, Essex and Hertfordshire. London's status as the capital of England, and later the United Kingdom, has never been granted or confirmed by statute or in written form.

Its status as a capital was established by constitutional convention, which means its status as de facto capital is a part of the UK's uncodified constitution. The capital of England was moved to London from Winchester as the Palace of Westminster developed in the 12th and 13th centuries to become the permanent location of the royal court, and thus the political capital of the nation. More recently, Greater London has been defined as a region of England and in this context is known as London.

Topography

Modern London stands on the Thames, its primary geographical feature, a navigable river which crosses the city from the south-west to the east. The Thames Valley is a flood plain surrounded by gently rolling hills including Parliament Hill, Addington Hills, and Primrose Hill. Historically London grew up at the lowest bridging point on the Thames. The Thames was once a much broader, shallower river with extensive marshlands; at high tide, its shores reached five times their present width.

Since the Victorian era the Thames has been extensively embanked, and many of its London tributaries now flow underground. The Thames is a tidal river, and London is vulnerable to flooding. The threat has increased over time because of a slow but continuous rise in high water level caused by climate change and by the slow 'tilting' of the British Isles (up in Scotland and Northern Ireland and down in southern parts of England, Wales and Ireland) as a result of post-glacial rebound.

In 1974 a decade of work began on the construction of the Thames Barrier across the Thames at Woolwich to deal with this threat. While the barrier is expected to function as designed until roughly 2070, concepts for its future enlargement or redesign are already being discussed.

London has had a small number of earthquakes over the years, notably those of 1750 which macroseismic information indicates had their epicentres directly under the city.  In 2018, two active faults were discovered running parallel to each other, directly under the centre of the city. Furthermore, the city has been damaged at least twice (with fatalities) in the earthquakes of 1382 and 1580. Those earthquakes had their epicentres under the English Channel. London's building code is being redrawn so that every new structure must be able to withstand an earthquake of at least 6.5 on the Richter scale.

Climate

London has a temperate oceanic climate (Köppen: Cfb). Rainfall records have been kept in the city since at least 1697, when records began at Kew. Mile End also had  in April 1893. The average annual precipitation amounts to about 600 mm, which is half the annual rainfall of New York City, but also lower than Rome, Lisbon, and Sydney, Australia. Despite its relatively low annual precipitation, London still receives 109.6 rainy days on the 1.0 mm threshold annually. However, London is vulnerable to climate change in the United Kingdom, and there is increasing concern among hydrological experts that London households may run out of water before 2050.

Records for atmospheric pressure have been kept at London since 1692.

Summers are generally warm, sometimes hot. London's average July high is 23.5 °C (74.3 °F). On average each year, London experiences 31 days above  and 4.2 days above . During the 2003 European heat wave, prolonged heat led to hundreds of heat-related deaths. There was also a previous spell of 15 consecutive days above  in England in 1976 which also caused many heat related deaths. Droughts can also, occasionally, be a problem, especially in summer, most recently in summer 2018, and with much drier than average conditions prevailing from May to December. However, the most consecutive days without rain was 73 days in the spring of 1893.

Winters are generally cool with little temperature variation. Heavy snow is rare but snow usually falls at least once each winter. Spring and autumn can be pleasant. As a large city, London has a considerable urban heat island effect, making the centre of London at times  warmer than the suburbs and outskirts.

Areas

Places within London's vast urban area are identified using area names, such as Mayfair, Southwark, Wembley, and Whitechapel. These are either informal designations, reflect the names of villages that have been absorbed by sprawl, or are superseded administrative units such as parishes or former boroughs.

Such names have remained in use through tradition, each referring to a local area with its own distinctive character, but without official boundaries. Since 1965, Greater London has been divided into 32 London boroughs in addition to the ancient City of London. The City of London is the main financial district, and Canary Wharf has recently developed into a new financial and commercial hub in the Docklands to the east.

The West End is London's main entertainment and shopping district, attracting tourists. West London includes expensive residential areas where properties can sell for tens of millions of pounds. The average price for properties in Kensington and Chelsea is over £2 million with a similarly high outlay in most of central London.

The East End is the area closest to the original Port of London, known for its high immigrant population, as well as for being one of the poorest areas in London. The surrounding East London area saw much of London's early industrial development; now, brownfield sites throughout the area are being redeveloped as part of the Thames Gateway including the London Riverside and Lower Lea Valley, which was developed into the Olympic Park for the 2012 Olympics and Paralympics.

Architecture

London's buildings are too diverse to be characterised by any particular architectural style, partly because of their varying ages. Many grand houses and public buildings, such as the National Gallery, are constructed from Portland stone. Some areas of the city, particularly those just west of the centre, are characterised by white stucco or whitewashed buildings. Few structures in central London pre-date the Great Fire of 1666, these being a few trace Roman remains, the Tower of London and a few scattered Tudor survivors in the city. Further out is, for example, the Tudor-period Hampton Court Palace, England's oldest surviving Tudor palace, built by Cardinal Thomas Wolsey in about 1515.

Part of the varied architectural heritage are the 17th-century churches by Wren, neoclassical financial institutions such as the Royal Exchange and the Bank of England, to the early 20th century Old Bailey and the 1960s Barbican Estate.

The 1939 Battersea Power Station by the river in the south-west is a local landmark, while some railway termini are excellent examples of Victorian architecture, most notably St. Pancras and Paddington. The density of London varies, with high employment density in the central area and Canary Wharf, high residential densities in inner London, and lower densities in Outer London.

The Monument in the City of London provides views of the surrounding area while commemorating the Great Fire of London, which originated nearby. Marble Arch and Wellington Arch, at the north and south ends of Park Lane, respectively, have royal connections, as do the Albert Memorial and Royal Albert Hall in Kensington. Nelson's Column (built to commemorate Admiral Horatio Nelson) is a nationally recognised monument in Trafalgar Square, one of the focal points of central London. Older buildings are mainly brick built, most commonly the yellow London stock brick or a warm orange-red variety, often decorated with carvings and white plaster mouldings.

In the dense areas, most of the concentration is via medium- and high-rise buildings. London's skyscrapers, such as 30 St Mary Axe, Tower 42, the Broadgate Tower and One Canada Square, are mostly in the two financial districts, the City of London and Canary Wharf. High-rise development is restricted at certain sites if it would obstruct protected views of St Paul's Cathedral and other historic buildings. This protective policy, known as 'St Paul’s Heights', has been in operation by the City of London since 1937. Nevertheless, there are a number of tall skyscrapers in central London (see Tall buildings in London), including the 95-storey Shard London Bridge, the tallest building in the United Kingdom.

Other notable modern buildings include The Scalpel, originally a nickname coined by the Financial Times due to its distinctive angular design but subsequently designated as its official name, 20 Fenchurch Street, dubbed "The Walkie-Talkie" because of its distinctive shape that resembles a two-way radio handset, the former City Hall in Southwark with its distinctive oval shape, the Art Deco BBC Broadcasting House plus the Postmodernist British Library in Somers Town/Kings Cross and No 1 Poultry by James Stirling. What was formerly the Millennium Dome, by the Thames to the east of Canary Wharf, is now an entertainment venue called the O2 Arena.

Cityscape

Natural history
The London Natural History Society suggests that London is "one of the World's Greenest Cities" with more than 40 per cent green space or open water. They indicate that 2000 species of flowering plant have been found growing there and that the tidal Thames supports 120 species of fish. They also state that over 60 species of bird nest in central London and that their members have recorded 47 species of butterfly, 1173 moths and more than 270 kinds of spider around London. London's wetland areas support nationally important populations of many water birds. London has 38 Sites of Special Scientific Interest (SSSIs), two national nature reserves and 76 local nature reserves.

Amphibians are common in the capital, including smooth newts living by the Tate Modern, and common frogs, common toads, palmate newts and great crested newts. On the other hand, native reptiles such as slowworms, common lizards, barred grass snakes and adders, are mostly only seen in Outer London.

Among other inhabitants of London are 10,000 red foxes, so that there are now 16 foxes for every square mile (6 per square kilometre) of London. These urban foxes are noticeably bolder than their country cousins, sharing the pavement with pedestrians and raising cubs in people's backyards. Foxes have even sneaked into the Houses of Parliament, where one was found asleep on a filing cabinet. Another broke into the grounds of Buckingham Palace, reportedly killing some of Queen Elizabeth II's prized pink flamingos. Generally, however, foxes and city folk appear to get along. A survey in 2001 by the London-based Mammal Society found that 80 per cent of 3,779 respondents who volunteered to keep a diary of garden mammal visits liked having them around. This sample cannot be taken to represent Londoners as a whole.

Other mammals found in Greater London are hedgehog, brown rat, mice, rabbit, shrew, vole, and grey squirrel. In wilder areas of Outer London, such as Epping Forest, a wide variety of mammals are found, including European hare, badger, field, bank and water vole, wood mouse, yellow-necked mouse, mole, shrew, and weasel, in addition to red fox, grey squirrel and hedgehog. A dead otter was found at The Highway, in Wapping, about a mile from the Tower Bridge, which would suggest that they have begun to move back after being absent a hundred years from the city. Ten of England's eighteen species of bats have been recorded in Epping Forest: soprano, Nathusius' and common pipistrelles, common noctule, serotine, barbastelle, Daubenton's, brown long-eared, Natterer's and Leisler's.

Among the strange sights in London have been a whale in the Thames, while the BBC Two programme Natural World: Unnatural History of London shows feral pigeons using the London Underground to get around the city, a seal that takes fish from fishmongers outside Billingsgate Fish Market, and foxes that will "sit" if given sausages.

Herds of red and fallow deer also roam freely within much of Richmond and Bushy Park. A cull takes place each November and February to ensure numbers can be sustained. Epping Forest is also known for its fallow deer, which can frequently be seen in herds to the north of the Forest. A rare population of melanistic, black fallow deer is also maintained at the Deer Sanctuary near Theydon Bois. Muntjac deer, which escaped from deer parks at the turn of the 20th century, are also found in the forest. While Londoners are accustomed to wildlife such as birds and foxes sharing the city, more recently urban deer have started becoming a regular feature, and whole herds of fallow deer come into residential areas at night to take advantage of London's green spaces.

Demography

The 2021 census recorded that 3,575,739 people or 40.6% of London's population were foreign-born making it the city with the second largest immigrant population after New York, in terms of absolute numbers. About 69% of children born in London in 2015 had at least one parent who was born abroad. The table to the right shows the commonest countries of birth of London residents. Note that some of the German-born population, in 18th position, are British citizens from birth born to parents serving in the British Armed Forces in Germany.

Increasing industrialisation swelled London's population throughout the 19th and early 20th centuries, and for some time in the late 19th and early 20th centuries it was the most populous city in the world. It peaked at 8,615,245 in 1939, just before the outbreak of the Second World War, but had declined to 7,192,091 by the 2001 Census. However, the population then grew by just over a million between the 2001 and 2011 Censuses, to reach 8,173,941 in the latter. 

However, London's continuous urban area extends beyond Greater London and numbered 9,787,426 people in 2011, while its wider metropolitan area had a population of 12–14 million, depending on the definition used. According to Eurostat, London is the second most populous metropolitan area in Europe. A net 726,000 immigrants arrived there in the period 1991–2001.

In population terms, London is the 19th largest city and the 18th largest metropolitan region.

Age structure and median age
Children younger than 14 constituted 20.6% of the population in Outer London in 2018, and 18% in Inner London. The 15–24 age group was 11.1% in Outer and 10.2% in Inner London, those aged 25–44 years 30.6% in Outer London and 39.7% in Inner London, those aged 45–64 years 24% and 20.7% in Outer and Inner London respectively. Those aged 65 and over are 13.6% in Outer London, but only 9.3% in Inner London.

The median age of London in 2018 was 36.5, which was younger than the UK median of 40.3.

Ethnic groups

According to the Office for National Statistics, based on 2011 Census estimates, 59.8 per cent of the 8,173,941 inhabitants of London were White, with 44.9% White British, 2.2% White Irish, 0.1% gypsy/Irish traveller and 12.1% classified as Other White. Meanwhile 20.9% of Londoners were of Asian and mixed-Asian descent, 19.7% being of full Asian descents and those of mixed-Asian heritage 1.2% of the population. Indians accounted for 6.6%, followed by Pakistanis and Bangladeshis at 2.7% each. Chinese peoples accounted for 1.5% and Arabs for 1.3%. A further 4.9% were classified as "Other Asian".

15.6% of London's population were of Black and mixed-Black descent. 13.3% of full Black descent, with mixed-Black heritage comprising 2.3%. Black Africans accounted for 7.0% of London's population, with 4.2% as Black Caribbean and 2.1% as "Other Black". 5.0% were of mixed race. The history of African presence in London extends back to the Roman period.

As of 2007, one fifth of primary school across London were from ethnic minorities. Altogether at the 2011 census, of London's 1,624,768 population aged 0 to 15, 46.4% were White, 19.8% Asian, 19% Black, 10.8% Mixed and 4% another ethnic group. In January 2005, a survey of London's ethnic and religious diversity claimed that more than 300 languages were spoken in London and more than 50 non-indigenous communities had populations of more than 10,000. Figures from the Office for National Statistics show that , London's foreign-born population was 2,650,000 (33%), up from 1,630,000 in 1997.

The 2011 census showed that 36.7% of Greater London's population were born outside the UK. Some of the German-born population were likely to be British nationals born to parents serving in the British Armed Forces in Germany. Estimates by the Office for National Statistics indicate that the five largest foreign-born groups living in London in the period July 2009 to June 2010 were born in India, Poland, the Republic of Ireland, Bangladesh and Nigeria. In the 2021 census 40.6% of London residents were foreign-born. The ethnic demographics of the 2021 census were reported as 53.8% White, with White British reported at 36.8%, Asian or Asian British at  20.8%, Black or Black British , 13.5%, mixed 5.7% and other at 6.3%.

Religion

According to the 2011 Census, the largest religious groupings were Christians (48.4%), followed by those of no religion (20.7%), Muslims (12.4%), no response (8.5%), Hindus (5.0%), Jews (1.8%), Sikhs (1.5%), Buddhists (1.0%) and other (0.6%).

London has traditionally been Christian, and has a large number of churches, particularly in the City of London. The well-known St Paul's Cathedral in the City and Southwark Cathedral south of the river are Anglican administrative centres, while the Archbishop of Canterbury, principal bishop of the Church of England and worldwide Anglican Communion, has his main residence at Lambeth Palace in the London Borough of Lambeth.

Important national and royal ceremonies are shared between St Paul's and Westminster Abbey. The Abbey is not to be confused with nearby Westminster Cathedral, the largest Roman Catholic cathedral in England and Wales. Despite the prevalence of Anglican churches, observance is low within the denomination. Anglican Church attendance continues a long, steady decline, according to Church of England statistics.

Notable mosques include the East London Mosque in Tower Hamlets, which is allowed to give the Islamic call to prayer through loudspeakers, the London Central Mosque on the edge of Regent's Park and the Baitul Futuh of the Ahmadiyya Muslim Community. After the oil boom, increasing numbers of wealthy Middle-Eastern Arab Muslims based themselves around Mayfair, Kensington and Knightsbridge in West London. There are large Bengali Muslim communities in the eastern boroughs of Tower Hamlets and Newham.

Large Hindu communities are found in the north-western boroughs of Harrow and Brent, the latter hosting what was until 2006 Europe's largest Hindu temple, Neasden Temple. London is also home to 44 Hindu temples, including the BAPS Shri Swaminarayan Mandir London. There are Sikh communities in East and West London, particularly in Southall, home to one of the largest Sikh populations and the largest Sikh temple outside India.

The majority of British Jews live in London, with notable Jewish communities in Stamford Hill, Stanmore, Golders Green, Finchley, Hampstead, Hendon and Edgware, all in North London. Bevis Marks Synagogue in the City of London is affiliated to London's historic Sephardic Jewish community. It is the only synagogue in Europe to have held regular services continually for over 300 years. Stanmore and Canons Park Synagogue has the largest membership of any Orthodox synagogue in Europe, overtaking Ilford synagogue (also in London) in 1998. The London Jewish Forum was set up in 2006 in response to the growing significance of devolved London Government.

Accents
Cockney is an accent heard across London, mainly spoken by working-class and lower-middle class Londoners. It is mainly attributed to the East End and wider East London, having originated there in the 18th century, although it has been suggested that the Cockney style of speech is much older. Some features of Cockney include, Th-fronting (pronouncing "th" as "f"), example, "some fings in life are bad" (heard in opening of "Always Look on the Bright Side of Life" in Monty Python's Life of Brian), "th" inside a word is pronounced with a "v" (brother becomes bruvva), H-dropping, example 'Ampshire for Hampshire (as Eliza Doolittle said in My Fair Lady), and, like most English accents, a Cockney accent drops the "r" after a vowel, for example, "car" is pronounced "cah". John Camden Hotten, in his Slang Dictionary of 1859, makes reference to Cockney "use of a peculiar slang language" (Cockney rhyming slang) when describing the costermongers of the East End. Examples include: using the word "treacle" to mean sweetheart (rhymes with Treacle tart), and "porkies" to mean lies (rhymes with Pork pies). Since the start of the 21st century the Cockney dialect is less common in parts of the East End itself, with modern strongholds including other parts of London and suburbs in the home counties.

Estuary English is an intermediate accent between Cockney and Received Pronunciation. It is widely spoken by people of all classes in London and south-eastern England, associated with the River Thames and its estuary.

Multicultural London English (MLE) is a multiethnolect becoming increasingly common in multicultural areas amongst young, working-class people from diverse backgrounds. It is a fusion of an array of ethnic accents, in particular Afro-Caribbean and South Asian, with a significant Cockney influence.

Received Pronunciation (RP) is the accent traditionally regarded as the standard for British English. It has no specific geographical correlate, although it is also traditionally defined as the standard speech used in London and south-eastern England. It is mainly spoken by upper-class and upper-middle class Londoners.

Economy

London's gross regional product in 2019 was £503 billion, around a quarter of UK GDP. London has five major business districts: the city, Westminster, Canary Wharf, Camden & Islington and Lambeth & Southwark. One way to get an idea of their relative importance is to look at relative amounts of office space: Greater London had 27 million m2 of office space in 2001, and the City contains the most space, with 8 million m2 of office space. London has some of the highest real estate prices in the world. London is the world's most expensive office market according to world property journal (2015) report.  the residential property in London is worth $2.2 trillion – the same value as that of Brazil's annual GDP. The city has the highest property prices of any European city according to the Office for National Statistics and the European Office of Statistics. On average the price per square metre in central London is €24,252 (April 2014). This is higher than the property prices in other G8 European capital cities; Berlin €3,306, Rome €6,188 and Paris €11,229.

The City of London

London's finance industry is based in the City of London and Canary Wharf, the two major business districts in London. London is one of the pre-eminent financial centres of the world as the most important location for international finance. London took over as a major financial centre shortly after 1795 when the Dutch Republic collapsed before the Napoleonic armies. For many bankers established in Amsterdam (e.g. Hope, Baring), this was only time to move to London. Also, London's market-centred system (as opposed to the bank-centred one in Amsterdam) grew more dominant in the 18th century. The London financial elite was strengthened by a strong Jewish community from all over Europe capable of mastering the most sophisticated financial tools of the time. This unique concentration of talents accelerated the transition from the Commercial Revolution to the Industrial Revolution. Writing about capitalism and the utility of diversity in his book on English society, French philosopher Voltaire expounded upon why England at that time was more prosperous in comparison to the country's less religiously tolerant European neighbours:

By the mid-19th century, London was the leading financial centre, and at the end of the century over half the world's trade was financed in British currency. Still,  London tops the world rankings on the Global Financial Centres Index (GFCI), and it ranked second in A.T. Kearney's 2018 Global Cities Index.

London's largest industry is finance, and its financial exports make it a large contributor to the UK's balance of payments. Around 325,000 people were employed in financial services in London until mid-2007. London has over 480 overseas banks, more than any other city in the world. It is also the world's biggest currency trading centre, accounting for some 37 per cent of the $5.1 trillion average daily volume, according to the BIS. Over 85 per cent (3.2 million) of the employed population of greater London works in the services industries. Because of its prominent global role, London's economy had been affected by the financial crisis of 2007–2008. However, by 2010 the city had recovered, put in place new regulatory powers, proceeded to regain lost ground and re-established London's economic dominance. Along with professional services headquarters, the City of London is home to the Bank of England, London Stock Exchange, and Lloyd's of London insurance market.

Over half the UK's top 100 listed companies (the FTSE 100) and over 100 of Europe's 500 largest companies have their headquarters in central London. Over 70 per cent of the FTSE 100 are within London's metropolitan area, and 75 per cent of Fortune 500 companies have offices in London. In a 1992 report commissioned by the London Stock Exchange, Sir Adrian Cadbury, chairman of his family's confectionery company Cadbury, produced the Cadbury Report, a code of best practice which served as a basis for reform of corporate governance around the world.

Media and technology

Media companies are concentrated in London, and the media distribution industry is London's second most competitive sector. The BBC is a significant employer, while other broadcasters also have headquarters around the city. Many national newspapers are edited in London; the term Fleet Street (where most national newspapers operated) remains a metonym for the British national press. London is a major retail centre and in 2010 had the highest non-food retail sales of any city in the world, with a total spend of around £64.2 billion. The Port of London is the second largest in the UK, handling 45 million tonnes of cargo each year.

A growing number of technology companies are based in London, notably in East London Tech City, also known as Silicon Roundabout. In 2014 the city was among the first to receive a geoTLD. In February 2014 London was ranked as the European City of the Future in the 2014/15 list by fDi Intelligence. Computer science pioneer Alan Turing hails from Maida Vale, west London.

The gas and electricity distribution networks that manage and operate the towers, cables and pressure systems that deliver energy to consumers across the city are managed by National Grid plc, SGN and UK Power Networks.

Tourism

London is one of the leading tourist destinations in the world and in 2015 was ranked as the most visited city in the world with over 65 million visits. It is also the top city in the world by visitor cross-border spending, estimated at US$20.23 billion in 2015. Tourism is one of London's prime industries, employing 700,000 full-time workers in 2016, and contributes £36 billion a year to the economy. The city accounts for 54% of all inbound visitor spending in the UK.  London was the world top city destination as ranked by TripAdvisor users.

In 2015 the top most-visited attractions in the UK were all in London. The top 10 most visited attractions were: (with visits per venue)
British Museum: 6,820,686
National Gallery: 5,908,254
Natural History Museum (South Kensington): 5,284,023
Southbank Centre: 5,102,883
Tate Modern: 4,712,581
Victoria and Albert Museum (South Kensington): 3,432,325
Science Museum: 3,356,212
Somerset House: 3,235,104
Tower of London: 2,785,249
National Portrait Gallery: 2,145,486

The number of hotel rooms in London in 2015 stood at 138,769, and is expected to grow over the years.

Transport

Transport is one of the four main areas of policy administered by the Mayor of London, but the mayor's financial control does not extend to the longer-distance rail network that enters London. In 2007 the Mayor of London assumed responsibility for some local lines, which now form the London Overground network, adding to the existing responsibility for the London Underground, trams and buses. The public transport network is administered by Transport for London (TfL).

The lines that formed the London Underground, as well as trams and buses, became part of an integrated transport system in 1933 when the London Passenger Transport Board or London Transport was created. Transport for London is now the statutory corporation responsible for most aspects of the transport system in Greater London, and is run by a board and a commissioner appointed by the Mayor of London.

Aviation

London is a major international air transport hub with the busiest city airspace in the world. Eight airports use the word London in their name, but most traffic passes through six of these. Additionally, various other airports also serve London, catering primarily to general aviation flights.
Heathrow Airport, in Hillingdon, West London, was for many years the busiest airport in the world for international traffic, and is the major hub of the nation's flag carrier, British Airways. In March 2008 its fifth terminal was opened. In 2014, Dubai gained from Heathrow the leading position in terms of international passenger traffic.
Gatwick Airport, south of London in West Sussex, handles flights to more destinations than any other UK airport and is the main base of easyJet, the UK's largest airline by number of passengers.
Stansted Airport, north-east of London in Essex, has flights that serve the greatest number of European destinations of any UK airport and is the main base of Ryanair, the world's largest international airline by number of international passengers.
Luton Airport, to the north of London in Bedfordshire, is used by several budget airlines (especially easyJet and Wizz Air) for short-haul flights.
London City Airport, the most central airport and the one with the shortest runway, in Newham, East London, is focused on business travellers, with a mixture of full-service short-haul scheduled flights and considerable business jet traffic.
Southend Airport, east of London in Essex, is a smaller, regional airport that caters for short-haul flights on a limited, though growing, number of airlines. In 2017, international passengers made up over 95% of the total at Southend, the highest proportion of any London airport.

Rail

Underground and DLR

Opened in 1863, the London Underground, commonly referred to as the Tube or just the Underground, is the oldest and third longest metro system in the world. The system serves 272 stations. and was formed from several private companies, including the world's first underground electric line, the City and South London Railway, which opened in 1890.

Over four million journeys are made every day on the Underground network, over 1 billion each year. An investment programme is attempting to reduce congestion and improve reliability, including £6.5 billion (€7.7 billion) spent before the 2012 Summer Olympics. The Docklands Light Railway (DLR), which opened in 1987, is a second, more local metro system using smaller and lighter tram-type vehicles that serve the Docklands, Greenwich and Lewisham.

Suburban
There are 368 railway stations in the London Travelcard Zones on an extensive above-ground suburban railway network. South London, particularly, has a high concentration of railways as it has fewer Underground lines. Most rail lines terminate around the centre of London, running into eighteen terminal stations, with the exception of the Thameslink trains connecting Bedford in the north and Brighton in the south via Luton and Gatwick airports. London has Britain's busiest station by number of passengers—Waterloo, with over 184 million people using the interchange station complex (which includes Waterloo East station) each year.  is the busiest station in Europe by the number of trains passing.

With the need for more rail capacity in London, the Elizabeth Line (also known as Crossrail) opened in May 2022. It is a new railway line running east to west through London and into the Home Counties with a branch to Heathrow Airport. It was Europe's biggest construction project, with a £15 billion projected cost.

Inter-city and international

London is the centre of the National Rail network, with 70 per cent of rail journeys starting or ending in London. King's Cross station and Euston station, which are both in London, are the starting points of the East Coast Main Line and the West Coast Main Line – the two main railway lines in Britain. Like suburban rail services, regional and inter-city trains depart from several termini around the city centre, directly linking London with most of Great Britain's major cities and towns.

Some international railway services to Continental Europe were operated during the 20th century as boat trains, such as the Admiraal de Ruijter to Amsterdam and the Night Ferry to Paris and Brussels. The opening of the Channel Tunnel in 1994 connected London directly to the continental rail network, allowing Eurostar services to begin. Since 2007, high-speed trains link St. Pancras International with Lille, Calais, Paris, Disneyland Paris, Brussels, Amsterdam and other European tourist destinations via the High Speed 1 rail link and the Channel Tunnel. The first high-speed domestic trains started in June 2009 linking Kent to London. There are plans for a second high speed line linking London to the Midlands, North West England, and Yorkshire.

Freight
Although rail freight levels are far down compared to their height, significant quantities of cargo are also carried into and out of London by rail; chiefly building materials and landfill waste. As a major hub of the British railway network, London's tracks also carry large amounts of freight for the other regions, such as container freight from the Channel Tunnel and English Channel ports, and nuclear waste for reprocessing at Sellafield.

Buses, coaches and trams

London's bus network runs 24 hours a day with about 9,300 vehicles, over 675 bus routes and about 19,000 bus stops. In 2019 the network had over 2 billion commuter trips per year. Since 2010 an average of £1.2 billion is taken in revenue each year. London has one of the largest wheelchair-accessible networks in the world and from the third quarter of 2007, became more accessible to hearing and visually impaired passengers as audio-visual announcements were introduced.

London's coach hub is Victoria Coach Station, an Art Deco building opened in 1932. The coach station was initially run by a group of coach companies under the name of London Coastal Coaches; however, in 1970 the service and station were included in the nationalisation of the country's coach services, becoming part of the National Bus Company. In 1988, the coach station was purchased by London Transport which then became Transport for London. Victoria Coach Station has over 14 million passengers a year and provides services across the UK and continental Europe.

London has a modern tram network, known as Tramlink, centred on Croydon in South London. The network has 39 stops and four routes, and carried 28 million people in 2013. Since June 2008, Transport for London has completely owned and operated Tramlink.

Cable car
London's first and to date only cable car is the London Cable Car, which opened in June 2012. The cable car crosses the Thames and links Greenwich Peninsula with the Royal Docks in the east of the city. It is integrated with London's Oyster Card ticketing system, although the Emirates Air Line fares are not included in the Oyster daily capping. It cost £60 million to build and can carry up to 2,500 passengers per hour in each direction at peak times. Similar to the London Cycle Hire Scheme bike hire scheme, the cable car was sponsored in a 10-year deal by the airline Emirates.

Cycling

In the Greater London Area, around 670,000 people use a bike every day, meaning around 7% of the total population of around 8.8 million use a bike on an average day. This relatively low percentage of bicycle users may be due to the poor investments for cycling in London of about £110 million per year, equating to around £12 per person, which can be compared to £22 in the Netherlands.

Cycling has become an increasingly popular way to get around London. The launch of a bicycle hire scheme in July 2010 was successful and generally well received.

Port and river boats
The Port of London, once the largest in the world, is now only the second-largest in the United Kingdom, handling 45 million tonnes of cargo each year as of 2009. Most of this cargo passes through the Port of Tilbury, outside the boundary of Greater London.

London has river boat services on the Thames known as Thames Clippers, which offer both commuter and tourist boat services. At major piers including Canary Wharf, London Bridge City, Battersea Power Station and London Eye (Waterloo), services depart at least every 20 minutes during commuter times. The Woolwich Ferry, with 2.5 million passengers every year, is a frequent service linking the North and South Circular Roads.

Roads

Although the majority of journeys in central London are made by public transport, car travel is common in the suburbs. The inner ring road (around the city centre), the North and South Circular roads (just within the suburbs), and the outer orbital motorway (the M25, just outside the built-up area in most places) encircle the city and are intersected by a number of busy radial routes—but very few motorways penetrate into inner London. A plan for a comprehensive network of motorways throughout the city (the Ringways Plan) was prepared in the 1960s but was mostly cancelled in the early 1970s. The A1 and M1 connect London to Leeds, and Newcastle and Edinburgh.

The Austin Motor Company began making hackney carriages (London taxis) in 1929, and models include Austin FX3 from 1948, Austin FX4 from 1958, with more recent models TXII and TX4 manufactured by London Taxis International. The BBC states, "ubiquitous black cabs and red double-decker buses all have long and tangled stories that are deeply embedded in London’s traditions".

In 2003, a congestion charge was introduced to reduce traffic volumes in the city centre. With a few exceptions, motorists are required to pay to drive within a defined zone encompassing much of central London. Motorists who are residents of the defined zone can buy a greatly reduced season pass. The London government initially expected the Congestion Charge Zone to increase daily peak period Underground and bus users, reduce road traffic, increase traffic speeds, and reduce queues; however, the increase in private for hire vehicles has affected these expectations. Over the course of several years, the average number of cars entering the centre of London on a weekday was reduced from 195,000 to 125,000 cars – a 35-per-cent reduction of vehicles driven per day.

Education

Tertiary education

London is a major global centre of higher education teaching and research and has the largest concentration of higher education institutes in Europe. According to the QS World University Rankings 2015/16, London has the greatest concentration of top class universities in the world and its international student population of around 110,000 is larger than any other city in the world. A 2014 PricewaterhouseCoopers report termed London the global capital of higher education.

A number of world-leading education institutions are based in London. In the 2022 QS World University Rankings, Imperial College London is ranked No. 6 in the world, University College London (UCL) is ranked 8th, and King's College London (KCL) is ranked 37th. All are regularly ranked highly, with Imperial College being the UK's leading university in the Research Excellence Framework ranking 2021. The London School of Economics has been described as the world's leading social science institution for both teaching and research. The London Business School is considered one of the world's leading business schools and in 2015 its MBA programme was ranked second-best in the world by the Financial Times. The city is also home to three of the world's top ten performing arts schools (as ranked by the 2020 QS World University Rankings): the Royal College of Music (ranking 2nd in the world), the Royal Academy of Music (ranking 4th) and the Guildhall School of Music and Drama (ranking 6th).

With  students in London and around 48,000 in University of London Worldwide, the federal University of London is the largest contact teaching university in the UK. It includes five multi-faculty universities – City, King's College London, Queen Mary, Royal Holloway and UCL – and a number of smaller and more specialised institutions including Birkbeck, the Courtauld Institute of Art, Goldsmiths, the London Business School, the London School of Economics, the London School of Hygiene & Tropical Medicine, the Royal Academy of Music, the Central School of Speech and Drama, the Royal Veterinary College and the School of Oriental and African Studies. Members of the University of London have their own admissions procedures, and most award their own degrees.

A number of universities in London are outside the University of London system, including Brunel University, Imperial College London, Kingston University, London Metropolitan University, University of East London, University of West London, University of Westminster, London South Bank University, Middlesex University, and University of the Arts London (the largest university of art, design, fashion, communication and the performing arts in Europe). In addition, there are three international universities in London – Regent's University London, Richmond, The American International University in London and Schiller International University.

London is home to five major medical schools – Barts and The London School of Medicine and Dentistry (part of Queen Mary), King's College London School of Medicine (the largest medical school in Europe), Imperial College School of Medicine, UCL Medical School and St George's, University of London – and has many affiliated teaching hospitals. It is also a major centre for biomedical research, and three of the UK's eight academic health science centres are based in the city – Imperial College Healthcare, King's Health Partners and UCL Partners (the largest such centre in Europe). Additionally, many biomedical and biotechnology spin out companies from these research institutions are based around the city, most prominently in White City. Founded by pioneering nurse Florence Nightingale at St Thomas' Hospital in 1860, the first nursing school is now part of King's College London. There are a number of business schools in London, including the London School of Business and Finance, Cass Business School (part of City University London), Hult International Business School, ESCP Europe, European Business School London, Imperial College Business School, the London Business School and the UCL School of Management. 

London is also home to many specialist arts education institutions, including the Central School of Ballet, London Academy of Music and Dramatic Art (LAMDA; president Benedict Cumberbatch), London College of Contemporary Arts (LCCA), London Contemporary Dance School, National Centre for Circus Arts, Royal Academy of Dramatic Art (RADA; president Sir Kenneth Branagh), Rambert School of Ballet and Contemporary Dance, the Royal College of Art, Sylvia Young Theatre School and Trinity Laban. 
The BRIT School in the London borough of Croydon provides training for the performing arts and the technologies that make performance possible, with actor Tom Holland among their alumni.

Primary and secondary education
The majority of primary and secondary schools and further-education colleges in London are controlled by the London boroughs or otherwise state-funded; leading examples include Ashbourne College, Bethnal Green Academy, Brampton Manor Academy, City and Islington College, City of Westminster College, David Game College, Ealing, Hammersmith and West London College, Leyton Sixth Form College, London Academy of Excellence, Tower Hamlets College, and Newham Collegiate Sixth Form Centre. There are also a number of private schools and colleges in London, some old and famous, such as City of London School, Harrow, St Paul's School, Haberdashers' Aske's Boys' School, University College School, The John Lyon School, Highgate School and Westminster School.

Societies
Important scientific learned societies based in London include the Royal Society—the UK's national academy of sciences and the oldest national scientific institution in the world—founded in 1660, and the Royal Institution, founded in 1799; the basement of the latter is where Michael Faraday first demonstrated electric motion in 1821. Since 1825, the Royal Institution Christmas Lectures have presented scientific subjects to a general audience, and speakers have included aerospace engineer Frank Whittle, naturalist David Attenborough and evolutionary biologist Richard Dawkins.

Culture

Leisure and entertainment

Leisure is a major part of the London economy. A 2003 report attributed a quarter of the entire UK leisure economy to London at 25.6 events per 1000 people. The city is one of the four fashion capitals of the world, and, according to official statistics, is the world's third-busiest film production centre, presents more live comedy than any other city, and has the biggest theatre audience of any city in the world.

Within the City of Westminster in London, the entertainment district of the West End has its focus around Leicester Square, where London and world film premieres are held, and Piccadilly Circus, with its giant electronic advertisements. London's theatre district is here, as are many cinemas, bars, clubs, and restaurants, including the city's Chinatown district (in Soho), and just to the east is Covent Garden, an area housing speciality shops. The city is the home of Andrew Lloyd Webber, whose musicals have dominated West End theatre since the late 20th century.  Agatha Christie's The Mousetrap, the world's longest-running play, has been performed in the West End since 1952. The Laurence Olivier Awards–named after Laurence Olivier–are given annually by the Society of London Theatre. The Royal Ballet, English National Ballet, Royal Opera, and English National Opera are based in London and perform at the Royal Opera House, the London Coliseum, Sadler's Wells Theatre, and the Royal Albert Hall, as well as touring the country.

It is home to vast numbers of retailers and department stores, including Selfridges flagship store. Knightsbridge, home to the equally renowned Harrods department store, lies to the south-west. Opened in 1760 with its flagship store on Regent Street since 1881, Hamleys is the oldest toy store in the world. Madame Tussauds wax museum opened in Baker Street in 1835.

London is home to designers John Galliano, Stella McCartney, Manolo Blahnik, and Jimmy Choo, among others; its renowned art and fashion schools make it one of the four international centres of fashion. Mary Quant designed the miniskirt in her King's Road boutique in Swinging Sixties London. London offers a great variety of cuisine as a result of its ethnically diverse population. Gastronomic centres include the Bangladeshi restaurants of Brick Lane and the Chinese restaurants of Chinatown. There are Chinese takeaways throughout London, as are Indian restaurants which provide Indian and Anglo-Indian cuisine. Around 1860, the first fish and chips shop in London was opened by Joseph Malin, a Jewish immigrant, in Bow. The full English breakfast dates from the Victorian era, and many cafe's in London serve a full English throughout the day. London has five 3-Michelin star restaurants, including Restaurant Gordon Ramsay in Chelsea. Many hotels in London provide a traditional afternoon tea service, such as the Oscar Wilde Lounge at the Hotel Café Royal in Piccadilly, and a themed tea service is also available, for example an Alice in Wonderland themed afternoon tea served at the Egerton House Hotel, and Charlie and the Chocolate Factory themed afternoon tea at One Aldwych in Covent Garden. The nation's most popular biscuit to dunk in tea, chocolate digestives have been manufactured by McVitie's at their Harlesden factory in north-west London since 1925.

There is a variety of annual events, beginning with the relatively new New Year's Day Parade, a fireworks display at the London Eye; the world's second largest street party, the Notting Hill Carnival, is held on the late August Bank Holiday each year. Traditional parades include November's Lord Mayor's Show, a centuries-old event celebrating the annual appointment of a new Lord Mayor of the City of London with a procession along the streets of the city, and June's Trooping the Colour, a formal military pageant performed by regiments of the Commonwealth and British armies to celebrate the Queen's Official Birthday. The Boishakhi Mela is a Bengali New Year festival celebrated by the British Bangladeshi community. It is the largest open-air Asian festival in Europe. After the Notting Hill Carnival, it is the second-largest street festival in the United Kingdom attracting over 80,000 visitors from across the country. First held in 1862, the RHS Chelsea Flower Show (run by the Royal Horticultural Society) takes place over five days in May every year.

LGBT scene

The first gay bar in London in the modern sense was The Cave of the Golden Calf, established as a night club in an underground location at 9 Heddon Street, just off Regent Street, in 1912 and became a haunt for the wealthy, aristocratic and bohemian. While London has been an LGBT tourism destination, after homosexuality was decriminalised in England in 1967 gay bar culture became more visible, and from the early 1970s Soho (and in particular Old Compton Street) became the centre of the London LGBT community. G-A-Y, previously based at the Astoria, and now Heaven, is a long-running night club.

Wider British cultural movements have also influenced LGBT culture: for example, the emergence of glam rock in the UK in the early 1970s, via Marc Bolan and David Bowie, saw a generation of teenagers begin playing with the idea of androgyny, and the West End musical The Rocky Horror Show, which debuted in London in 1973, is also widely said to have been an influence on countercultural and sexual liberation movements. The Blitz Kids (which included Boy George) frequented the Tuesday club-night at Blitz in Covent Garden, helping launch the New Romantic subcultural movement in the late 1970s. Today, the annual London Pride Parade and the London Lesbian and Gay Film Festival are held in the city.

Literature, film and television

London has been the setting for many works of literature. The pilgrims in Geoffrey Chaucer's late 14th-century Canterbury Tales set out for Canterbury from London—specifically, from the Tabard inn, Southwark. William Shakespeare spent a large part of his life living and working in London; his contemporary Ben Jonson was also based there, and some of his work, most notably his play The Alchemist, was set in the city. A Journal of the Plague Year (1722) by Daniel Defoe is a fictionalisation of the events of the 1665 Great Plague.

The literary centres of London have traditionally been hilly Hampstead and (since the early 20th century) Bloomsbury. Writers closely associated with the city are the diarist Samuel Pepys, noted for his eyewitness account of the Great Fire; Charles Dickens, whose representation of a foggy, snowy, grimy London of street sweepers and pickpockets has been a major influence on people's vision of early Victorian London; and Virginia Woolf, regarded as one of the foremost modernist literary figures of the 20th century. Later important depictions of London from the 19th and early 20th centuries are Arthur Conan Doyle's Sherlock Holmes stories. In 1898, H. G. Wells' sci-fi novel The War of the Worlds sees London (and the south of England) invaded by Martians. Also of significance is Letitia Elizabeth Landon's Calendar of the London Seasons (1834). Modern writers pervasively influenced by the city include Peter Ackroyd, author of a "biography" of London, and Iain Sinclair, who writes in the genre of psychogeography. In the 1940s, George Orwell wrote essays in the London Evening Standard, most notably "A Nice Cup of Tea", which concerned the nation's methods on making tea, and "The Moon Under Water", which provided a detailed description of his ideal pub. In 1958, author Michael Bond created Paddington Bear, a refugee found in London Paddington station by the Brown family who adopt him. Paddington has been adapted for the screen, including Paddington (2014) which features the calypso song "London is the Place for Me".

London has played a significant role in the film industry. Major studios within or bordering London include Pinewood, Elstree, Ealing, Shepperton, Twickenham, and Leavesden, with the James Bond and Harry Potter series among many notable films produced here. Working Title Films has its headquarters in London. A post-production community is centred in Soho, and London houses six of the world’s largest visual effects companies, such as Framestore. The Imaginarium, a digital performance-capture studio, was founded by Andy Serkis. London has been the setting for films including Oliver Twist (1948), Scrooge (1951), Peter Pan (1953), The 101 Dalmatians (1961), My Fair Lady (1964), Mary Poppins (1964), Blowup (1966), A Clockwork Orange (1971), The Long Good Friday (1980), The Great Mouse Detective (1986), Notting Hill (1999), Love Actually (2003), V for Vendetta (2005), Sweeney Todd: The Demon Barber of Fleet Street (2008) and The King's Speech (2010). Notable actors and filmmakers from London include; Charlie Chaplin, Alfred Hitchcock, Michael Caine, Emma Thompson, Gary Oldman, Guy Ritchie, Christopher Nolan, Alan Rickman, Jude Law, Helena Bonham Carter, Idris Elba, Tom Hardy, Keira Knightley and Daniel Day-Lewis. Ealing comedies have featured Alec Guinness, Hammer Horrors have starred Christopher Lee, while Richard Curtis's rom-coms have featured Hugh Grant. The largest cinema chain in the country, Odeon Cinemas was founded in London in 1928 by Oscar Deutsch. First held in 1949, since 2017 the British Academy Film Awards (BAFTAs) have taken place at the Royal Albert Hall. Founded in 1957, the BFI London Film Festival takes place over two weeks every October. 

London is a major centre for television production, with studios including Television Centre, ITV Studios, Sky Campus and Fountain Studios; the latter hosted the original talent shows, Pop Idol, The X Factor, and Britain's Got Talent, before each format was exported around the world. Formerly a franchise of ITV, Thames Television featured comedians such as Benny Hill and Rowan Atkinson (Mr. Bean was first screened by Thames), while Talkback produced Da Ali G Show which featured Sacha Baron Cohen as Ali G, a faux-streetwise gangster from Staines, west of London. Many television shows have been set in London, including the popular television soap opera EastEnders, broadcast by the BBC since 1985.

Museums, art galleries and libraries

London is home to many museums, galleries, and other institutions, many of which are free of admission charges and are major tourist attractions as well as playing a research role. The first of these to be established was the British Museum in Bloomsbury, in 1753. Originally containing antiquities, natural history specimens, and the national library, the museum now has 7 million artefacts from around the globe. In 1824, the National Gallery was founded to house the British national collection of Western paintings; this now occupies a prominent position in Trafalgar Square.

The British Library is the second largest library in the world, and the national library of the United Kingdom. There are many other research libraries, including the Wellcome Library and Dana Centre, as well as university libraries, including the British Library of Political and Economic Science at LSE, the Central Library at Imperial, the Maughan Library at King's, and the Senate House Libraries at the University of London.

In the latter half of the 19th century the locale of South Kensington was developed as "Albertopolis", a cultural and scientific quarter. Three major national museums are there: the Victoria and Albert Museum (for the applied arts), the Natural History Museum, and the Science Museum. The National Portrait Gallery was founded in 1856 to house depictions of figures from British history; its holdings now comprise the world's most extensive collection of portraits. The national gallery of British art is at Tate Britain, originally established as an annexe of the National Gallery in 1897. The Tate Gallery, as it was formerly known, also became a major centre for modern art. In 2000, this collection moved to Tate Modern, a new gallery housed in the former Bankside Power Station which is accessed by pedestrians north of the Thames via the Millennium Bridge.

Music

London is one of the major classical and popular music capitals of the world and hosts major music corporations, such as Universal Music Group International and Warner Music Group, and countless bands, musicians and industry professionals. The city is also home to many orchestras and concert halls, such as the Barbican Arts Centre (principal base of the London Symphony Orchestra and the London Symphony Chorus), the Southbank Centre (London Philharmonic Orchestra and the Philharmonia Orchestra), Cadogan Hall (Royal Philharmonic Orchestra) and the Royal Albert Hall (The Proms). The Proms, an eight-week summer season of daily orchestral classical music first held in 1895, ends with the Last Night of the Proms (works by Edward Elgar, Henry Wood, Thomas Arne and Hubert Parry feature at the climax). London's two main opera houses are the Royal Opera House and the London Coliseum (home to the English National Opera). The UK's largest pipe organ is at the Royal Albert Hall. Other significant instruments are in cathedrals and major churches—the church bells of St Clement Danes feature in the 1744 nursery rhyme "Oranges and Lemons", and the lyrics journey through churches and bells of 18th century London. Several conservatoires are within the city: Royal Academy of Music, Royal College of Music, Guildhall School of Music and Drama and Trinity Laban.

London has numerous venues for rock and pop concerts, including the world's busiest indoor venue, the O2 Arena, and Wembley Arena, as well as many mid-sized venues, such as Brixton Academy, the Hammersmith Apollo and the Shepherd's Bush Empire. Several music festivals, including the Wireless Festival, Lovebox and Hyde Park's British Summer Time, are held in London.

The city is home to the original Hard Rock Cafe and the Abbey Road Studios, where The Beatles recorded many of their hits. In the 1960s, 1970s and 1980s, musicians and groups like Elton John, Pink Floyd, David Bowie, Queen, The Kinks, Cliff Richard, The Rolling Stones, The Who, Eric Clapton, Led Zeppelin, Iron Maiden, T. Rex, Fleetwood Mac, Elvis Costello, Dire Straits, Cat Stevens, The Police, The Cure, Madness, Culture Club, Dusty Springfield, Phil Collins, Rod Stewart, Status Quo and Sade, derived their sound from the streets and rhythms of London.

London was instrumental in the development of punk music, with figures such as the Sex Pistols, The Clash and fashion designer Vivienne Westwood all based in the city. Other artists to emerge from the London music scene include George Michael, Kate Bush, Seal, the Pet Shop Boys, Siouxsie and the Banshees, Bush, the Spice Girls, Jamiroquai, Blur, The Prodigy, Gorillaz, Mumford & Sons, Coldplay, Amy Winehouse, Adele, Sam Smith, Ed Sheeran, Ellie Goulding, Dua Lipa and Florence and the Machine. Artists from London with a Caribbean influence include Hot Chocolate, Billy Ocean, Soul II Soul and Eddy Grant, with the latter fusing reggae, soul and samba with rock and pop. London is also a centre for urban music. In particular the genres UK garage, drum and bass, dubstep and grime evolved in the city from the foreign genres of house, hip hop, and reggae, alongside local drum and bass. Music station BBC Radio 1Xtra was set up to support the rise of local urban contemporary music both in London and in the rest of the United Kingdom. The British Phonographic Industry's annual popular music awards, the Brit Awards, are held in London, usually in February.

Recreation

Parks and open spaces

A 2013 report by the City of London Corporation said that London is the "greenest city" in Europe with 14,164 hectares (35,000 acres) of public parks, woodlands and gardens. The largest parks in the central area of London are three of the eight Royal Parks, namely Hyde Park and its neighbour Kensington Gardens in the west, and Regent's Park to the north. Hyde Park in particular is popular for sports and sometimes hosts open-air concerts. Regent's Park contains London Zoo, the world's oldest scientific zoo, and is near Madame Tussauds Wax Museum.

Close to Hyde Park are smaller Royal Parks, Green Park and St. James's Park. A number of large parks lie outside the city centre, including Hampstead Heath and the remaining Royal Parks of Greenwich Park to the southeast and Bushy Park and Richmond Park (the largest) to the southwest, Hampton Court Park is also a royal park, but, because it contains a palace, it is administered by the Historic Royal Palaces, unlike the eight Royal Parks.

Close to Richmond Park is Kew Gardens, which has the world's largest collection of living plants. In 2003, the gardens were put on the UNESCO list of World Heritage Sites. There are also parks administered by London's borough Councils, including Victoria Park in the East End and Battersea Park in the centre. Some more informal, semi-natural open spaces also exist, including the  Hampstead Heath of North London, and Epping Forest, which covers 2,476 hectares (6,118 acres) in the east. Both are controlled by the City of London Corporation. Hampstead Heath incorporates Kenwood House, a former stately home and a popular location in the summer months when classical musical concerts are held by the lake, attracting thousands of people every weekend to enjoy the music, scenery and fireworks. Epping Forest is a popular venue for various outdoor activities, including mountain biking, walking, horse riding, golf, angling, and orienteering.

Walking

Walking is a popular recreational activity in London. Areas that provide for walks include Wimbledon Common, Epping Forest, Hampton Court Park, Hampstead Heath, the eight Royal Parks, canals and disused railway tracks.

Other long-distance paths, linking green spaces, have also been created, including the Capital Ring, the Green Chain Walk, London Outer Orbital Path ("Loop"), Jubilee Walkway, Lea Valley Walk, and the Diana, Princess of Wales Memorial Walk.

Sport

London has hosted the Summer Olympics three times: in 1908, 1948, and 2012, making it the first city to host the modern Games three times. The city was also the host of the British Empire Games in 1934. In 2017, London hosted the World Championships in Athletics for the first time.

London's most popular sport is football, and it has seven clubs in the Premier League in the 2022–23 season: Arsenal, Brentford, Chelsea, Crystal Palace, Fulham, Tottenham Hotspur, and West Ham United. Other professional men's teams in London are AFC Wimbledon, Barnet, Bromley, Charlton Athletic, Dagenham & Redbridge, Leyton Orient, Millwall, Queens Park Rangers and Sutton United. Four London-based teams are in the Women's Super League: Arsenal, Chelsea, Tottenham and West Ham United.

From 1924, the original Wembley Stadium was the home of the English national football team. It hosted the 1966 FIFA World Cup Final, with England defeating West Germany, and served as the venue for the FA Cup Final as well as rugby league's Challenge Cup final. The new Wembley Stadium serves the same purposes and has a capacity of 90,000. The women's team defeated Germany at Wembley to win Euro 2022.

Three Premiership Rugby union teams are based in London, Harlequins, London Irish and Saracens. Ealing Trailfinders, London Sottish and Richmond play in the RFU Championship; other rugby union clubs in the city include Scottish, Rosslyn Park F.C., Westcombe Park R.F.C. and Blackheath F.C. Twickenham Stadium in south-west London hosts home matches for the England national rugby union team and has a capacity of 82,000 now that the new south stand has been completed.

While rugby league is more popular in the north of England, there are two professional rugby league clubs in London – the London Broncos in the second-tier RFL Championship, who play at the Trailfinders Sports Ground in West Ealing, and the third-tier League 1 team, the London Skolars from Wood Green, Haringey.

One of London's best-known annual sports competitions is the Wimbledon Tennis Championships, held at the All England Club in the south-western suburb of Wimbledon since 1877. Played in late June to early July, it is the oldest tennis tournament in the world and widely considered the most prestigious. Founded in London in 1881, Slazenger has provided tennis balls for Wimbledon since 1902, the oldest sponsorship in sport.

London has two Test cricket grounds, Lord's (home of Middlesex C.C.C.) in St John's Wood and the Oval (home of Surrey C.C.C.) in Kennington. Lord's has hosted four finals of the Cricket World Cup and is known as the Home of Cricket. Other key events are the annual mass-participation London Marathon, in which some 35,000 runners attempt a  course around the city, and the University Boat Race on the Thames from Putney to Mortlake.

Notable people

See also

Outline of England
Outline of London

Notes

References

Bibliography

External links
London.gov.uk – Greater London Authority
VisitLondon.com – official tourism site
Museum of London
 
London in British History Online, with links to numerous authoritative online sources
"London", In Our Time, BBC Radio 4 discussion with Peter Ackroyd, Claire Tomalin and Iain Sinclair (28 September 2000)

Old maps of London, from the Eran Laor Cartographic Collection, National Library of Israel

London
British capitals
Capitals in Europe
Greater London
Port cities and towns in Southern England
Staple ports
Southern England
1st-century establishments in Roman Britain
Populated places established in the 1st century
Capital cities in the United Kingdom